Piccadilly Cinema(s), formerly Piccadilly Theatre and Forum Cinema (The Forum), and also known as The Piccadilly,  is a cinema located on the corner of  O'Connell Street and Childers Street in North Adelaide, South Australia.

History

1940: original architecture
The cinema was built for D. Clifford Theatres Ltd. (owned by Dan Clifford) as the Piccadilly Theatre in 1940, in art deco / moderne style, with elements of Jazz style and Streamline Modern, for instance its chevron-shaped windows. The building and interiors were designed in 1939 by Greg Bruer, Jack Evans and James Hall (Evans, Bruer, & Hall), in association with Sydney architects Guy Crick and Bruce Furse. The design was similar to Clifford's Vogue Theatre in Kingswood (opened 1939), but with some additional features. Work commenced in February 1940, and was completed by October that year.

Its name was chosen by Clifford, for its association with the busy traffic hub of Piccadilly Circus in London, as well as the Adelaide Hills town of Piccadilly, a place where many English people had settled in the colony of South Australia. Clifford was familiar with the area, having lived on Mount Lofty. The cinema, which had cost £26,000 to build, was built by local builder R. J. Nurse, of Norwood. In a newspaper article announcing the opening, the architectural details of the cinema are described in some detail, including the ventilation system provided by the specially-designed windows and vents on the roof. The report says "One of the outstanding features of the theatre is the circuitous stair hall leading from the upper foyer to the circle". It describes cream-coloured walls, maroon seating and curtains, and a rubber covering over the floor which include a large red star.

It was announced on 22 October 1940 that Mr. A. G. Harrison, who was general manager of Clifford Theatres and had been responsible for the design and installation of the lighting in the new theatre, would be the manager of the Piccadilly. The gala opening of the cinema took place on 23 October 1940, raising a total of £108, to be divided among the Red Cross Society, the Fighting Forces Comforts Fund, and the Adelaide Children's Hospital. The films First Love, starring Deanna Durbin, and Missing Evidence were shown, along with Cinesound and 20th Century Fox newsreels and fashion forecasts by Vyvyan Donner. The event was attended by the architects and their wives, luminaries of the film industry, and other eminent people.

The Piccadilly was considered the flagship of the Clifford Circuit.

1940s: change of ownership
Clifford's death in 1942 led to Greater Union acquiring the Clifford Theatre Circuit in March 1947. The purchase price of £300,000 for the 22 suburban and regional cinemas was "believed to be the largest motion picture transaction ever made in Australia". The Clifford name was retained as a tribute to the entrepreneur, South Australian staff were retained, and his sister Mary Gordon took over operations. In the 1951–52 edition of Film Weekly Motion Picture Directory, Piccadilly Theatre is listed as being operated by the Clifford Theatre Circuit, with a seating capacity of 1,437. 

Greater Union renamed the Piccadilly as the Forum Cinema (aka "The Forum") on 2 March 1967, celebrated by screening the American comedy It's a Mad, Mad, Mad, Mad World in 70mm film.

The Forum was closed in February 1983, and Bob Wallis of Wallis Cinemas bought the building in the same year, in order to save it from being demolished.

1980s: heritage listing
The building is heritage-listed on both the South Australian Heritage Register and the Register of the National Estate. It was listed on the national register on 21 October 1980, noted for both its architectural and environmental significance, and on the state register on 11 September 1986.

1990: conversion to multiplex
In September 1989 a Heritage Agreement was entered into between the proprietors of the property and the State Heritage Branch of South Australia to turn the single auditorium of the original theatre into three smaller theatres in line with 1980s practice. The agreement involves the dismantling and storage of the upper circle balcony on site to be returned if ever the theatre were returned to a single auditorium. Plans were also to involve the incorporation of original materials into the refurbished structure.

Wallis converted the old single-screen picture palace, which had a 1400-seat capacity across its upper and lower level, into a multiplex with three screens, The former balcony became screen one, and screens two and three occupied the former orchestra level. The cinema reopened in 1990 as Piccadilly Cinema.

2022 refurbishment
The cinema closed for a major renovation on 6 June 2021. The  refurbishment has been carried out IA Design and Premier Building Solutions, with the cinema set to reopen on 15 December 2022. A documentary film is being made by Scarlett Media to coincide with the reopening, which includes people's reminiscences of their experiences at the cinema. During the refurbishments, some original features were discovered that had been since covered up, such as the mural of Piccadilly Circus, and terrazzo tiling under a floor that had been carpeted in the 1980s. They were also able to restore a 35mm film projector that had been in storage, which could be used for retrospectives and special events.

Apart from the interior refit of the theatres, installation of a lift and other features, a new licensed food and drinks lounge space will replace the shopfronts O'Connell Street, where the original candy bar was situated, and there will be a replica of the original sign atop the building. It is intended that the venue can also host live music on weekends sometimes, and, in the future, arts festival and other events.

Location and ownership
The cinema's street address is 181–193 O'Connell Street, with the building situated on the corner of  O'Connell Street and Childers Street in North Adelaide.

The company that owns it is registered as Piccadilly Cinemas, and its trading name is Piccadilly Cinema. It is part of the Wallis Cinemas family-owned chain.

Recognition
In 2021, the online platform Flicks included the Piccadilly in its list of "The 25 most beautiful cinemas in Australia".

See also
Capri Theatre, built by Clifford as the Goodwood Star

Footnotes

References

External links

Piccadilly / Forum, North Adelaide on CAARP (Cinema and Audience Research Project)

Cinemas in Adelaide
Buildings and structures in Adelaide
Tourist attractions in Adelaide
Culture of Adelaide
Art Deco architecture in South Australia
South Australian Heritage Register
1940 establishments in Australia